Her Husband's Wife is a 1926 German silent film directed by Felix Basch and starring Nils Asther, Lucy Doraine, and Erich Kaiser-Titz.

Cast
Nils Asther
Lucy Doraine
Erich Kaiser-Titz
Rudolf Klein-Rogge
Olga Belajeff
Olga Limburg
Sophie Pagay
Albert Paulig
Luigi Serventi

References

External links

Films of the Weimar Republic
German silent feature films
Films directed by Felix Basch
German black-and-white films